Hrishikesh is an Indian actor, best known for his appearance as Dhanush's brother in Velaiilla Pattadhari and its sequel.

Personal life
His grandfather is S. V. Ramanan, and his great grandfather is Krishnaswami Subrahmanyam. He is the cousin of music director Anirudh Ravichander and brother-in-law to actor Dhanush, from the latter's ex-wife's side.

Early life and career
Hrishikesh did his schooling from PSBB and then studied Visual Communication from Madras University where he was involved in a lot of creative projects. He then assisted Jayendra, working in ads and documentaries. He made his acting debut portraying Dhanush's younger brother in Velaiilla Pattadhari (2014). For the role, he received an SMS from Dhanush's production office, which asked him to audition for the role. He was selected after his screen test ended successfully.

Filmography

References

Male actors in Tamil cinema
Living people
Indian male film actors
21st-century Indian male actors
Place of birth missing (living people)
Year of birth missing (living people)